The Battle of Cook's Mills was the last engagement between U.S. and British armies in the Niagara, and the penultimate engagement (followed by the Battle of Malcolm's Mills) on Canadian soil during the War of 1812. After about a half-hour, American forces out-maneuvered the British column and destroyed all grain and flour.

Background
General Gordon Drummond had lifted the Siege of Fort Erie on 21 September 1814, and withdrew to a strong defensive position at Fort Chippawa on the north bank of Chippawa Creek. An American division under Major General George Izard had marched overland from Plattsburgh, New York to reinforce the Americans at Fort Erie (commanded by Major General Jacob Brown). Being the senior Major General, Izard took command of the combined force. The more aggressive Brown wished to attack Drummond immediately, with the combined force numbering 6,300. Izard chose not to risk the casualties of attacking a strong defensive position. Angered at Izard's lack of action, Brown left with his division (half the army's strength) and marched to Sacketts Harbor, New York, where a British attack was feared.

Izard finally marched north to Chippawa Creek. The creek was unfordable, and the bridge had been destroyed. During 16 October, his artillery exchanged fire with the British, without effect.

Battle

Attempting to deprive the British of their chief source of flour, Izard sent a brigade of about 1,200 men, consisting of the 5th, 14th, 15th and 16th U.S. Infantry with some detachments of riflemen and U.S. Dragoons under Brigadier General Daniel Bissell, to take Cooks Mills on Lyon's Creek in Crowland township. In response, Drummond dispatched about 750 men (the 6th Regiment, the Glengarry Light Infantry and the flank companies of the 104th Regiment, with a 6-pounder gun and a Congreve rocket detachment) under Lieutenant Colonel Christopher Myers to reconnoitre the American force.

On the morning of 19 October, Myers came into contact with the American picket just east of the mills.  A half-hour fight ensued, but the Americans could not be lured from the cover of the woods. Observing American soldiers moving through the trees on his right and left, Myers feared his force was being out-manoeuvred. He ordered a retreat, and the Americans promptly pursued his column nearly to their camp at the Lyon's Creek settlement.  Returning to Cooks Mills, the Americans destroyed all the grain and flour found in the mill, and the next day they withdrew to their camp at Black Creek.

Aftermath
The battle showed the effects of Izard's well trained troops. Despite this minor victory, it became apparent that Drummond was not going to move from his defences. Izard also heard that British ships dominated Lake Ontario, and any American advance risked being cut off by a landing in its rear. He withdrew to Fort Erie. The British loss of 200 bushels of wheat was offset when several American provision boats crossed the Niagara unaware of Izard's retreat and fell into British hands.

Izard later destroyed Fort Erie and returned to the U.S. side of the river. Drummond moved to the remains of the fort but chose not to rebuild it, and the fighting along the Niagara Frontier came to an end.

The site of the battle was designated a National Historic Site in 1921, and is a unit of the national park system. A federal cairn were erected in 1923, and the current plaque replaced the original on the cairn in 1977. Bicentennial commemorations in 2014 included construction of a visitors’ plaza and the unveiling of interpretive markers.

Eight active regular battalions of the United States Army (1-2 Inf, 2-2 Inf, 1-3 Inf, 2-3 Inf, 4-3 Inf, 1-4 Inf, 2-4 Inf and 3-4 Inf) perpetuate the lineages of a number of American infantry regiments (the old 5th, 14th and 16th Infantry Regiments) that took part in the battle.

Notes

Sources
Heidler, David; Heidler, Jeanne, editors Encyclopedia of the War of 1812
War of 1812 site

Cook's Mills
Cook's Mills
National Historic Sites in Ontario
Cook's Mills
October 1814 events